Kallikrein-2 is a protein that in humans is encoded by the KLK2 gene, and is particularly associated with prostatic tissue.

References

Further reading

External links
 The MEROPS online database for peptidases and their inhibitors: S01.161